Henrik Åberg (born 1976), is a Swedish singer who won TV4's Sikta mot stjärnorna in 1995, imitating Elvis Presley performing the song "Blue Hawaii", and scoring chart successes in Sweden.

He also represented Sweden in the European final of European Soundmix Show, on 13 April 1996 in Amsterdam, performing Love Me Tender. At Melodifestivalen 1996 he participated with the song Du är alltid en del utav mej written by Lasse Berghagen and Lasse Holm. While the song did not reach the final, it became a Svensktoppen hit for 36 weeks.

Henrik Åberg then went on a summer tour with an own band, where ABBA bassist Rutger Gunnarsson was Kapellmeister. Between 1996 and 1998 he scored totally five Sensktoppen hits. In 2001, "En dans i morgonsolen" with Martinez charted for 17 weeks at Svenskoppen.

Discography

Albums
 Du är alltid en del utav mej (1996, Sony Music)
 Hemma igen (1997, Sony Music)
 Allt jag har (2003, Annie Records och City Music)
 Elvis Forever: A Tribute to the King (2011, with Jack Baymoore)
 Mitt julalbum (2014)

Svensktoppen songs
Du är alltid en del utav mej - 1996
Bara en clown - 1996
Vi ska aldrig ta farväl - 1997
Jenny och jag - 1998
Hemma igen - 1998
En dans i morgonsolen - 2001 (with Martinez)

References

External links

1976 births
Living people
Swedish rock singers
21st-century Swedish singers
21st-century Swedish male singers
Melodifestivalen contestants of 1996